Hamis Kiggundu (born February 10, 1984), commonly known as Ham, is a Ugandan businessman, investor, real estate and property developer, philanthropist, author and lawyer.

Kiggundu is the CEO of the Ham Group of Companies, and the author of Success and Failure Based on Reason and Reality and Reason as the World Masterpiece.

He is one of the wealthiest people in Uganda with an estimated net worth of US$870 Million as of March 2021 according to the  Forbes Africa  Special Report on Uganda by Penresa.

Background and early life 

Kiggundu was born in 1984 in the Kalungu Masaka District in the Central Region of Uganda. Kiggundu is the son of Mr. Haruna Segawa and Mrs. Nakayiza Jalia, who is part of a family with extensive property investments in Kampala.

Kiggundu was born and raised in a Muslim family. He talks about Islam as "the highest achievement of a lifetime" and that he would not choose another religion.

Education 
He attended his elementary education in Masaka, joined Kabojja International School in Kampala District for his high school education, and later graduated from Makerere University with a Bachelors of Laws.

He joined the Law Development Centre where he graduated with a diploma in legal practice.

Nakivubo Stadium redevelopment 
In 2015, President Museveni asked Kiggundu to redevelop and upgrade Nakivubo Stadium into a modern sports facility.

Philanthropy 
In April 2020 Kiggundu donated food relief to Uganda's COVID-19 task force. He also donated food supplies to over 100 Ugandan journalists through the Uganda Journalists Association, but was also criticized for providing cash handouts to journalists.

In July 2021, Kiggundu donated to the Uganda Government a total of USh 530 million to help in the purchase COVID-19 vaccine doses for Ugandans and additionally called upon other able Ugandans and corporate entities to join him in saving lives as a way of giving back to the Ugandan Community.

Lawsuit 
In February 2020, Kiggundu sued Africa's Diamond Trust Bank for allegedly defrauding him for over US$30 million (USh 34.29 billion and US$23.4 million) under what he called "unclear debits" from his bank accounts over a spread period of ten years.

In October 2020, Kiggundu won the case and the Ugandan High Court ordered Diamond Trust Bank to refund all the unlawfully withdrawn monies totalling to USh 34.29 billion and US$23.4 million, with an additional 8% interest for legal costs. The court additionally ordered the bank to unconditionally release/discharge all mortgages allegedly created over all Kiggundu's properties and all corporate and personal guarantees issued by Kiggundu. The court also issued a permanent injunction to prevent DTB from enforcing the mortgages over Kiggundu's properties. DTB Bank later appealed the decision in the High Court and were issued an injunction halting payment of the monies.

In November 2022, Kiggundu sued the Kabaka of Buganda and the Commissioner Land registration in the Ministry of Lands over cancellation of land titles of Kigo Land that sits on 140 acres.

Awards 
In 2018 Kiggundu was given an award as an acknowledgement for his book, Success and Failure Based on Reason and Reality. It was nominated the best book of the year in the category of "Business Motivation" at an event held by the Book Forum of Uganda in Kampala.

Bibliography 

 Success and Failure Based on Reason and Reality in 2018
 Reason as the World Masterpiece in 2021

See also 
 List of wealthiest people in Uganda
 Banking in Uganda

References 

Ugandan writers
Ugandan non-fiction writers
21st-century Ugandan writers
Ugandan philanthropists
Ugandan businesspeople in real estate
Ugandan Muslims
Businesspeople in agriculture
Businesspeople in the hospitality industry
Living people
1984 births
Ugandan chief executives
Muslim writers
Male non-fiction writers
Ugandan industrialists
Businesspeople in education
Ugandan business executives
Ugandan businesspeople